William Spencer Davis (June 23, 1908 – January 27, 1981) was an American baseball infielder in the Negro leagues. 

A native of Winston-Salem, North Carolina, Davis played from 1938 to 1942 with the Jacksonville Red Caps, Atlanta Black Crackers/Indianapolis ABCs and New York Black Yankees. He served in the US Army during World War II. Davis died in Salisbury, North Carolina in 1981 at age 72.

References

External links
 and Seamheads

Jacksonville Red Caps players
Atlanta Black Crackers players
New York Black Yankees players
1908 births
1981 deaths
African Americans in World War II
United States Army personnel of World War II
Baseball infielders
African-American United States Army personnel